Cornelis Rugier Willem Karel van Alderwerelt van Rosenburgh (Java Island, 23 December 1863 – The Hague, 1 March 1936) was a Dutch botanist.

 Many older texts instead use the abbreviation "v.A.v.R."

Works
 Malayan ferns. 1908
 Malayan fern allies. Handbook to the determination of the fern allies of the Malayan islands (incl. those of the Malay peninsula, the Philippines and New Guinea). – Batavia: Department of Agriculture, Industry and Commerce Netherlands India, 1915. Disponible en téléchargement (Première édition : 1908), Supplément en 1917).
 Malayan ferns and fern allies. 1917.
New and Interesting Malayan Ferns. A series of papers, published in the Bulletin du Départmente de l'Agriculture aux Indes Néerlandaises and the Bulletin du Jardin de Botanique Buitenzorg:
New or interesting Malayan ferns. Bull. Dept. Agric. Indes Néerlandaises. 18: 1–28. 1908.
New or interesting Malayan ferns 2. Bull. Dept. Agric. Indes Néerlandaises. 21: 1–9. 1908.
New or interesting Malayan ferns 3. Bull. Jard. Bot. . II, 1: 1–29. 1911.
New or interesting Malayan ferns 4. Bull. Jard. Bot. . II, 7: 1–41. 1912.
New or interesting Malayan ferns 5. Bull. Jard. Bot. . II, 11: 1–38. 1913.
New or interesting Malayan ferns 6. Bull. Jard. Bot. . II, 16: 1–60. 1914.
New or interesting Malayan ferns 7. Bull. Jard. Bot. . II, 20: 1–28. 1915.
New or interesting Malayan ferns 8. Bull. Jard. Bot. . II, 23: 1–27. 1916.
New or interesting Malayan ferns 9. Bull. Jard. Bot. . II, 24: 1–8. 1917.
New or interesting Malayan ferns 10. Bull. Jard. Bot. . II, 28: 1–66. 1918.
New or interesting Malayan ferns 11. Bull. Jard. Bot. . III, 2: 129–186. 1920.
New or interesting Malayan ferns 12. Bull. Jard. Bot. .  III, 5: 179–246. 1922–1923.

References

1863 births
1936 deaths
20th-century Dutch botanists